Events from the year 1709 in Russia

Incumbents
 Monarch – Peter I

Events

 Central Naval Museum
 
  
 
 Great Northern War
 Battle of Poltava
 Executions of Cossacks in Lebedin
 Great Frost of 1709
 Battle of Krasnokutsk–Gorodnoye
 Surrender at Perevolochna
 Swedish invasion of Russia
 Treaty of Thorn (1709)

Births

 
 Elizabeth of Russia

Deaths

References

 
Years of the 18th century in Russia